The Ewald sphere is a geometric construction used in electron, neutron, and X-ray crystallography which demonstrates the relationship between: 

 the wavevector of the incident and diffracted x-ray beams, 
 the diffraction angle for a given reflection, 
 the reciprocal lattice of the crystal 

It was conceived by Paul Peter Ewald, a German physicist and crystallographer. Ewald himself spoke of the sphere of reflection.

Ewald's sphere can be used to find the maximum resolution available for a given electron, neutron or X-ray wavelength and the unit cell dimensions. It is often simplified to the two-dimensional "Ewald's circle" model or may be referred to as the Ewald sphere.

Ewald construction 

A crystal can be described as a lattice of points of equal symmetry. The requirement for constructive interference in a diffraction experiment means that in momentum or reciprocal space the values of momentum transfer where constructive interference occurs also form a lattice (the reciprocal lattice). For example, the  reciprocal lattice of a simple cubic real-space lattice is also a simple cubic structure. Another example, the reciprocal lattice of an FCC crystal real-space lattice is a BCC structure, and vice versa. The aim of the Ewald sphere is to determine which lattice planes (represented by the grid points on the reciprocal lattice) will result in a diffracted signal for a given wavelength, of incident radiation. 

The diffracted plane wave has a wave vector . The difference between the wave-vectors of diffracted and incident wave is defined as scattering vector . Since  and  have the same length the scattering vector must lie on the surface of a sphere of radius . This sphere is called the Ewald sphere.

The reciprocal lattice points are the values of momentum transfer where the  Bragg diffraction condition is satisfied and for diffraction to occur with a large crystal the scattering vector must be equal to a reciprocal lattice vector. Geometrically this means that if the origin of reciprocal space is placed at the tip of   then diffraction will occur only  for reciprocal lattice points that lie on the surface of the Ewald sphere. For smaller crystals and in almost all cases with electron diffraction one will have significant diffraction if the reciprocal lattice points are close to the Ewald sphere -- they do not have to be exactly on it.

Applications

Small scattering-angle limit
When the wavelength of the radiation to be scattered is much smaller than the spacing between atoms, the Ewald sphere radius becomes large compared to the spatial frequency of atomic planes.  This is common, for example, in transmission electron microscopy.  In this approximation, diffraction patterns in effect illuminate planar slices through the origin of a crystal's reciprocal lattice.  However, it is important to note that while the Ewald sphere may be quite flat, a diffraction pattern taken perfectly aligned down a zone axis (high-symmetry direction) contains precisely zero  spots that exactly satisfy the Bragg condition. As one tilts a single crystal with respect to the incident beam, diffraction spots wink on and off as the Ewald sphere cuts through one zero order Laue zone (ZOLZ) after another.

See also
 Bragg's law
 Laue equations
 Kikuchi line (solid state physics)

References

External links 
 Origin of the Ewald Sphere in scattering (TEM)
 See also Chapter 5 in this web site

Diffraction
Crystallography